Cabanatuan longganisa, also known as batutay, is a Filipino beef sausage originating from Cabanatuan, Nueva Ecija. It can be served sweet (hamonado), garlicky (de recado), or "skinless" (without the casing). It is celebrated in the annual "Longganisa Festival" of Cabanatuan.

See also
Chicken longganisa
Fish longganisa
 List of sausages

References

Philippine sausages